Body fat redistribution (BFR) syndrome, sometimes called fat derangement, is a medical condition characterized by fat loss (or occasionally fat gain), often in the cheeks or face.  BFR most often occurs in HIV/AIDS patients undergoing antiretroviral therapy.

Symptoms
The most common manifestations of body fat redistribution are accumulations of fat in the central body in the form of a fat pad on the back of the neck and an accumulation of visceral fat in the abdomen or belly.  This fat accumulation is accompanied by a loss of subcutaneous fat in the face, arms, legs, and buttocks.

Adverse effects
Cosmetic concerns may cause patients to refuse or stop treatment.  If severe enough, the fat accumulation may result in sleep apnea or other sleep disorders, migraines, decreased range of motion, discomfort due to pressure on internal organs, and general loss of condition.  Fat loss may result in pain in the buttocks when seated.  Other potential complications resulting from BFR include high cholesterol, high levels of triglycerides, insulin resistance, hyperglycemia, diabetes, gout, and cardiovascular disease.  BFR is also associated with certain metabolic abnormalities such as elevations of plasma sugar and fats, but the precise relationship is unknown.

Diagnosis

Definition
No firm definition of body fat redistribution syndrome exists as yet.  At least four syndromes have been described that are characterized by the accumulation of fat, and one by the loss of fat; combinations of these may occur in an individual. Gender, age, and pre-therapy body weight appear to influence the severity of BFR in patients.  BFR is distinct from lipodystrophy, which simply refers to fat loss.

Treatment
Treatment of symptoms may include cosmetic surgery such as collagen implants; treatment of the underlying syndrome may include changing from protease inhibitors to an NNRTI.

See also 
 HIV-associated lipodystrophy
 Drug-induced lipodystrophy

References
 Hanna, Leslie. "Body Fat Changes: More than Lipodystrophy." Bulletin of Experimental Treatments for AIDS, Jan 1999.  Accessed 14 Jun 2006.

HIV/AIDS
Syndromes